Taofeek Kunle Owonikoko is an American physician who is Professor and Vice-Chair for Faculty Development, Department of Haematology and Medical Oncology at the Winship Cancer Institute. His research considers small cell lung cancer. He was a 2019 Emory University Woodruff Leadership Academy Fellow.

Early life and education 
Owonikoko is from Nigeria. He attended the Obafemi Awolowo University, where he specialised in medicine. Owonikoko completed his residency at the Lagos University Teaching Hospital.  In 1998 he was awarded a German research fellowship to join Heinrich Heine University Düsseldorf. Whilst in Germany Owonikoko earned a doctoral degree in anatomical pathology.

Research and career 
In 2001 Owonikoko joined Johns Hopkins University as a postdoctoral fellow, where he worked in molecular imaging. Owonikoko was designated as a Distinguished Cancer Scholar in the Georgia Cancer Coalition in 2008. That year he joined Emory University as an Associate Professor. 

He specialises in small cell lung cancer. He leads clinical trials into novel immunotherapy drugs, which can be used to treat aggressive and recurrent cancers. He has studied the efficacy of talazoparib as a treatment for small cell lung cancer patients with homologous recombination repair deficiency.

Owonikoko has called for more people of color to be involved with clinical cancer trials. In particular, Black patients are below 4% of patients involved in clinical trials for lung cancer. He believes that this underrepresentation perpetuates healthcare outcome inequality.

Awards and honours 

 2008 Who's Who
 2016 National Cancer Institute Cancer Clinical Investigator Team Leadership Award
 2019 Emory University Woodruff Leadership Academy Fellow

Selected publications

References 

Living people
Year of birth missing (living people)
American hematologists
Emory University faculty
Nigerian hematologists
Heinrich Heine
Cancer researchers
Nigerian emigrants to the United States
Nigerian oncologists